Smaisuk Krisansuwan (born 8 July 1943) is a former Thai cyclist. He competed in the individual pursuit and team pursuit events at the 1964 Summer Olympics.

References

1943 births
Living people
Smaisuk Krisansuwan
Smaisuk Krisansuwan
Cyclists at the 1964 Summer Olympics
Place of birth missing (living people)
Asian Games medalists in cycling
Cyclists at the 1962 Asian Games
Cyclists at the 1966 Asian Games
Medalists at the 1962 Asian Games
Medalists at the 1966 Asian Games
Smaisuk Krisansuwan
Smaisuk Krisansuwan
Smaisuk Krisansuwan
Smaisuk Krisansuwan